Wayne Pedzwater (September 2, 1956 – March 17, 2005), born Wayne Pedziwiatr, was an American bassist.

Pedzwater collaborated with many notable artists, such as Buddy Rich, John Lennon, Michael Jackson, Jewel, The Honeydrippers, Simon and Garfunkel, Carly Simon, Bette Midler, Carole King, Billy Cobham, Mike Francis and Yoko Ono.

He was also a member of Blood, Sweat & Tears.

On 17 March 2005, he died from stomach cancer. He is survived by his wife Patty Forbes Pedziwiatr.

Selected Discography

 The Dream 1973-2011 with Michael Franks (2012)
 King of Pop with Michael Jackson (2008) 
 Blood on the Dance Floor/Invincible with Michael Jackson (2006)
 Mile 23 with Dana Edelman (2005)
 Greatest Dance Hits Sugar Beats (2004)
 A Woman's Love with Vaneese Thomas (2003)
 Different Road with Rhonda Stisi (2003)
 Making Good Noise with Tom Chapin (2003)
 Final Fantasy: The Spirits Within [Original Motion Picture Soundtrack] with Elliot Goldenthal (2001)
 Great Big Fun for the Very Little One with Tom Chapin
 Car Tunes Sugar Beats (2000)
 Live In Rome with Billy Cobham (2000)
 Grail: The Rock Musical of the Future with Bob Christianson (2000)
 This Pretty Planet with Tom Chapin (2000)
 Joy: A Holiday Collection with Jewel (1999)
 And Then Some with Dan Wilensky (1998)
 I'm an Animal: Songs of Earth as Animals See It with Sarah Weeks (1998)
 In My Hometown with Tom Chapin (1998)
 Blood on the Dance Floor: HIStory in the Mix with Michael Jackson (1997)
 Helium with John Forster (1997)
 Imago with Lorenza Ponce (1997)
 Medicine 4 My Pain with Lynden David Hall (1996)
 Around the World & Back Again with Tom Chapin (1996)
 HIStory - Past, Present And Future - Book I with Michael Jackson (1995) 
 By Design with Billy Cobham (1992)
 City Streets with Carole King (1989) 
 Share My Dream with Gerry Niewood (1985) 
 Lifetime Guarantee with Michael Jackson (1983)

References

External links 
 
 
 
Amazing Bass solo (BS&T)　Wayne PedzWater
Buddy Rich with Boston Pops 1981 (Rich playing solo with bass player Wayne Pedzwater)

American male bass guitarists
American jazz bass guitarists
20th-century American bass guitarists
21st-century American bass guitarists
American pop musicians
American rock musicians
1956 births
2005 deaths
20th-century American male musicians
21st-century American male musicians
American male jazz musicians
Deaths from stomach cancer